Tilaiya railway station is located in Nawada district in the Indian state of Bihar.

History
Gaya was connected to Kiul in 1879 by the South Bihar Railway Company (operated by the East Indian Railway Company).

The Bakhtiyarpur–Rajgir line was extended to Tilaiya in 2010.

Electrification
Feasibility studies for the electrification of the Manpur–Tilaiya–Kiul sector was announced in the rail budget for 2010–11.

Line extension

References

External links
 Trains at Tilaiya

Railway stations in Nawada district
Danapur railway division
Railway junction stations in Bihar
Railway stations in India opened in 1879